Peer Gynt is a 1998 theatrical adaptation of Norwegian playwright Henrik Ibsen's classic play Peer Gynt by American playwright David Henry Hwang and Swiss director Stephan Muller. Combining many contemporary references with a streamlined turn of the original story, it was commissioned by the Trinity Repertory Company in Providence, Rhode Island. It opened there on February 3, 1998.

The script is published by Playscripts, Inc.

References

Works based on Peer Gynt
Plays by David Henry Hwang
1998 plays
Plays based on other plays